Bacalao is an album by saxophonist Eddie "Lockjaw" Davis with organist Shirley Scott recorded in 1959 for the Prestige label.

Reception

The Allmusic review states, "Organ combo soul-jazz was still new and fresh in 1959, and Scott was helping Davis find new ways to interpret very familiar melodies. Although not quite essential, Bacalao is a rewarding example of Davis' ability to thrive in an organ/tenor setting".

Track listing 
 "Last Train From Overbrook" (James Moody) – 5:07
 "Sometimes I'm Happy" (Vincent Youmans, Irving Caesar) – 6:23
 "That Old Black Magic" (Harold Arlen, Johnny Mercer) – 5:02
 "Fast Spiral" (Davis) – 4:35
 "Dobbin' with Redd Foxx" (Moody) – 5:29
 "Come Rain or Come Shine" (Arlen, Mercer) – 4:54
 "Dansero" (Lee Daniels, Richard Hayman, Sol Parker) – 5:33
 "When Your Lover Has Gone" (Einar Aaron Swan) – 6:23

Personnel 
 Eddie "Lockjaw" Davis – tenor saxophone
 Shirley Scott – organ
 George Duvivier – bass
 Arthur Edgehill – drums
 Ray Barretto – bongos
 Luis Perez – bongos, congas

References 

Eddie "Lockjaw" Davis albums
1960 albums
Albums produced by Esmond Edwards
Albums recorded at Van Gelder Studio
Prestige Records albums
Shirley Scott albums